Kupon or Kupan or Kupen, also rendered as Kupun, may refer to:
 Kupon-e Olya
 Kupon-e Sofla
 Kupon-e Vosta

See also 
 Coupon